Hermann Berg (August 29, 1905 – October 21, 1982) was a German politician of the Free Democratic Party (FDP) and former member of the German Bundestag.

Life 
Berg was a member of the German Bundestag from 27 June 1955, when he succeeded the late Carl Wirths, until 1957.

Literature

References

1905 births
1982 deaths
Members of the Bundestag for North Rhine-Westphalia
Members of the Bundestag 1953–1957
Members of the Bundestag for the Free Democratic Party (Germany)